The State Route System in Alabama uses the standard numbering convention: odd numbers signify a north–south state route, and even numbers signify an east–west route. Often more than one route number shares the same roadway, so identifying which route the mile markers are for is often difficult.

In no case does a state route number mirror a U.S. Highway number. As such, the following state routes do not exist: 11, 29, 31, 43, 45, 72, 78, 80, 82, 84, 90, 98, 231, 278, 280, 331, 411, or 431.


State routes list
Lengths are from ADOT Milepost Maps unless otherwise noted

See also

References

External links
Alabama Department of Transportation, 95th Annual Report (PDF) (includes a route log on pages 91–102)
Alabama State Highway Ending Photos

 
State routes